Sara Murray is an American journalist who works as a political correspondent for CNN.

Life and career
Murray was born and raised in Mount Pleasant, Michigan and is a graduate of the University of Maryland. After school, she moved to New York City where she worked for the Wall Street Journal where she covered the 2008 financial crisis and Mitt Romney's 2012 presidential campaign; and later served as their anchor for their digital network. In 2015, she accepted a position with CNN as a political correspondent where she covered Republican candidates in the 2016 and 2020 presidential campaigns. President Donald Trump called her "unemotional", "low-key" and "terrible".

Personal life
In April 2017, she married MSNBC correspondent Garrett Haake in Austin, Texas. They have since divorced. Murray lives in Washington, D.C.

References

CNN people
Living people
American women journalists
University System of Maryland alumni
People from Mount Pleasant, Michigan
People from Washington, D.C.
21st-century American women
1985 births